The natural gas in Qatar covers a large portion of the world supply of natural gas. The majority of Qatar's natural gas is located in the massive offshore North Field, which spans an area roughly equivalent to Qatar itself. A part of the world's largest non-associated, natural-gas field, the North Field, is a geological extension of Iran's South Pars / North Dome Gas-Condensate field, which holds an additional  of recoverable natural-gas reserves.

While Qatar is a significant oil producer, the government has devoted more resources to the development of natural gas in the contemporary era, particularly for export as liquefied natural gas (LNG). In 2006, Qatar reportedly surpassed Indonesia to become the largest exporter of LNG in the world. Together, revenues from the oil and natural-gas sectors amount to 60% of the country's GDP. Domestically, Qatar's energy supply is produced almost exclusively by natural gas (99.2%), with oil making up the rest (0.8%).

Production and exports

In 1997, Qatar began exporting LNG when it sent  of LNG to Spain. Qatar has become the world's leading LNG exporter next to Australia. Japan, South Korea, and India were the primary destinations for Qatar's LNG exports, accounting for about 57% in 2009. European markets including Belgium, the United Kingdom and Spain were also significant buyers of Qatari LNG, accounting for an additional 33%. 

In 2009, Qatar produced  of natural gas, three times the amount produced in 2000. Although the increase in natural-gas production fuels the growing natural-gas requirements of domestic industry and its GTL projects, the bulk of this increase is going towards LNG exports.

Qatari government officials have noted that they do not anticipate building any more LNG facilities in the near-term future, and that any additional capacity increases will be the result of improvements in the existing facilities. 

In 2016, QatarEnergy has entered into an agreement with Dolphin Energy to increase exports by 1 billion cubic feet of natural gas per day. This increase if natural gas exports to UAE is responding to increase of demand in the UAE and also matches the export gas pipeline's supply capacity of 3.2 billion cubic feet per day.

In line with Qatar's plans to significantly expand natural-gas production during the next five years, the country in 2018 pledged investments worth $11.6 billion in Germany, including for the construction of a LNG terminal. QatarEnergy thereby hopes to compete with Russian LNG deliveries to Germany amid a fierce debate in the country about its dependence on Russian LNG supply.

North Field

The bulk of Qatar's expected future increases in natural-gas production will come from projects related to the massive North Field. In 2005, Qatari government officials became worried that the North Field’s natural gas reserves were being developed too quickly, which could reduce pressure in the field's reservoirs and possibly damage its long-term production potential. In early 2005, the government placed a moratorium on additional natural-gas development projects at the North Field, pending the results of a study of the field's reservoirs. In April 2017, Qatar lifted the moratorium to allow new developments to begin.

ExxonMobil is the largest foreign investor in Qatar's North Field. Aside from Al Khaleej, the company is also involved in increasing natural gas supplies for the Qatargas LNG projects, each of which will rely on significant increases in output from the North Field over the next several years (see the LNG Section below for additional details).

Qatar required foreign expertise to develop the North Field and initiate LNG production. Even though Qatar had expropriated the North Field in the late 1970s, pundits viewed it as "expropriation-lite," since Royal Dutch Shell continued to act as adviser and expert consultant. The emirate was actually anxious to grant equity stakes to international oil companies in any venture because QatarEnergy lacked the financial and technical expertise to efficiently develop the fields.

Shell, previously one of Qatar's major partners, abandoned all ongoing discussions, ostensibly lured by the promise of more-profitable gas ventures in Australia. The emirate, however, forged ahead with its plans through collaboration with QatarEnergy, BP and CFP and formed Qatargas. Moved in part by intense Japanese interest in LNG imports, the emirate tasked Qatargas with North-Field development. Yet intermittent foreign and domestic issues have impeded this project for another decade.

Gas-to-liquids
Gas-to-liquids (GTL) technology uses a refining process to turn natural gas into liquid fuels, such as low sulfur diesel and naphtha, among other products. GTL projects have received significant attention in Qatar over the last several years, and Qatar's government had originally set a target of developing  of GTL capacity by 2012. However, project cancellations and delays since the North Field reserve assessment, has substantially lowered this target. There were three big GTL projects at hand:

 Barzan Gas project and Palm GTL: The Palm project was originally slated to produce  of liquids for export, although estimated costs spiraled from $7 billion to $15 billion according to industry estimates. And so in February 2007, ExxonMobil announced that it had cancelled its planned Palm GTL project due to rising costs. The company will instead develop the Barzan gas project in the North Field, which is scheduled to supply  of natural gas to Qatar’s domestic market. The Barzan field is expected to come online 2016.
 Oryx GTL: a joint-venture of QP (51%) and Sasol-Chevron GTL (49%), and has the capacity to produce  of liquid fuels. The plant was formally commissioned in June 2006, but technical problems prevented the consortium from loading the first export cargo until April 2007. Depending on the outcome of the North Field reservoir study, Oryx GTL may choose to expand production capacity of the plant in the future.
 Pearl GTL: In February 2007, the same week that ExxonMobil decided to cancel its GTL plans, Shell held a groundbreaking ceremony for its Pearl GTL project. The Pearl plant is 51% owned by QP, though Shell will act as the operator of the project with a 49% stake. Like the Palm GTL Shell's Pearl GTL has experienced significant cost escalation. Originally estimated at $4 billion, industry sources believe Pearl GTL will now cost between $12 and $18 billion. Pearl GTL will be the first integrated GTL operation in the world, meaning it will have upstream natural gas production integrated with the onshore conversion plant.

By 2012, Qatar is likely to have  of GTL capacity from Oryx GTL and Pearl GTL.

Gas to food
Natural gas can also be used as main raw material in the production of high protein feed for cattle, fish, or poultry with tiny water and land foot print by cultivating Methylococcus capsulatus bacteria culture. Qatar can emerge as a major food products exporter by using its cheaper natural gas. The carbon dioxide gas produced as by-product from these plants can be put to use in cheaper production of algae oil or spirulina from algaculture to mitigate green house gas (GHG) emissions.

Natural gas project
The government celebrated twenty years of independence in September 1991 with the start of phase one of the North Field development project. The gas project, in a 6000 km² field off Qatar's northeast coast, is supervised by Bechtel based in the United States and by Technip in France. The project marks a major step in Qatar's switch from a reliance on oil to gas for most of its revenues. The North Field is the world's largest natural gas field, and its exploitation will place Qatar in the top ranks of the world's gas producers. Natural gas from other fields provides fuel for power generation and raw materials for fertilizers, petrochemicals, and steel plants. With the expected depletion of oil reserves by about 2023, planners hope natural gas from the North Field will provide a significant underpinning for the country's economic development.

In the early 1970s, Qatar flared about 80% of the 16.8 hm³ of natural gas produced daily in association with crude oil liftings. In that decade, the country made progress in using its natural gas resources despite several setbacks. Whereas nearly 66% of onshore gas was flared in 1974, by 1979 that proportion had fallen to less than 5%.

Two natural gas liquids plants began operation in Umm Said in 1981. NGL-1 used gas produced from the Dukhan field, and NGL-2 processed gas associated with offshore fields. The combined daily capacities were 2378 tons of propane, 1840 tons of butane, 1480 tons of condensate, and 2495 tons of ethane-rich gas. However, repeated difficulties prevented the plants from coming on-line as scheduled and operating at full capacity. A massive explosion at the precursor of NGL-1 in 1977 killed six people and caused $500 million in damage. NGL-2 had problems with the pipelines that connected the plant with offshore fields. The sharp drop in oil production in the 1980s meant that lack of feedstock caused plant shutdowns and underproduction. As a result, downstream (see Glossary) users suffered as well. In 1982 the two plants produced 500,000 tons of propane and butane—slightly more than one-half of plant capacity. Condensate production lagged even further at 138,000 tons, or 40% of capacity.

This gloomy outlook is mitigated to some degree by prospective development of the massive natural gas reserves in the North Field. Qatargas was established in 1984 as a joint venture with QatarEnergy and foreign partners to market and export LNG from the North Field.
Phase one of the $1.3 billion project was officially inaugurated on September 3, 1991. By the end of the month, it was pumping 23 hm³ of gas a day from sixteen wells.

QatarEnergy plans a massive development at Ras Laffan in association with the North Field project. In addition to a new port with LNG, petroleum products, and container loading berths, a methanol plant with a yearly production of 2500 tons and a petrochemical complex with an annual production of 450,000 tons are planned. The development is scheduled for completion in the late 1990s.

In line with its desire to diversify the firms engaged in developing its resources, Qatar signed a letter of intent in February 1991 with Chubu Electrical Power in Japan to supply 4 million tons per year of North Field gas for 25 years, starting in 1997. This amount represents two-thirds of Qatargas's expected capacity of about 6 million tons per year.

See also

Dolphin Gas Project
Qatargas

References

External links
QATAR'S NATURAL GAS: THE FOREIGN-POLICY DRIVER-Justin Dargin
Qatar Natural Gas
Thrives on Natural Gas as Companies, Workers Flee Dubai